Union of Prayer was a previous term for some Roman Catholic lay ecclesial movements.

They tended to be archconfraternities aiming at the conversion of various groups to Catholicism.  Some of these included:

 Association of Prayer and Penitence in honour of the Heart of Jesus - offering reparation for outrages against the Catholic Church and the pope
 Archconfraternity of Our Lady of Compassion for the Return of England to the Catholic Faith
 Pious Union of Prayer to Our Lady of Compassion for the Conversion of Heretics
 Archconfraternity of Prayers and Good Works for the Reunion of the Eastern Schismatics with the Church under the patronage of Our Lady of the Assumption'''

References

Catholic lay organisations